The Arabic title al-Dawla (often rendered ad-Dawla, ad-Daulah, ud-Daulah, etc.) means 'dynasty' or 'state', (in modern usage, 'government') and appears in many honorific and regnal titles in the Islamic world. Invented in the 10th century for senior statesmen of the Abbasid Caliphate, such titles soon spread throughout the Islamic world and provided the model for a broad variety of similar titles with other elements, such as al-Din ('Faith' or 'Religion').

Origin and evolution 
The term  originally meant 'cycle, time, period of rule'. It was particularly often used by the early Abbasid caliphs to signify their "time of success", i.e. reign, and soon came to be particularly associated with the reigning house and acquire the connotation of 'dynasty'. In modern usage, since the 19th century, it has come to mean "state", in particular a secular state of the Western type as opposed to the dynastic or religion-based state systems current until then in the Islamic world.

The same honour was also bestowed on al-Qasim's son, al-Husayn, who was named  ('Support of the Dynasty') by al-Muqtadir in February 932.

After this time, "the bestowing of such titles on governors formally symbolised the handing over of political power to the 'princelings' of provincial dynasties" (G. Endress).

The example set by the Hamdanids and Buyids was soon imitated throughout the Islamic world, from the Samanids and Ghaznavids in the east to the Fatimids of Egypt and even some of the taifa kingdoms in Muslim Spain. By the end of the 10th century, however, the use of the  element had become so widespread that it had become debased, and began to be complemented—and eventually replaced—by other titles. Henceforth, titles with the elements  ('religion'),  ([Islamic] community'),  ('faith') began to appear.

Indeed, the proliferation of multiple and ever more lofty titles which began with the award of the  forms was so swift and extensive, that already around the year 1000 the scholar al-Biruni lamented the practice, complaining that "the matter became utterly opposed to common sense, and clumsy to the highest degree, so that he who mentions them gets tired before he has scarcely commenced, and he who writes them loses his time and writing space, and he who addresses them risks missing the time of prayer". Nevertheless, despite their debasement, the titles remained indicative of their bearer's "high standing in the community", according to F. Rosenthal. In India, they continued to be used by individual Muslim rulers, and in Iran, cabinet ministers until 1935 often received titles with the  compound.

In the major Indian Muslim princely state of Hyderabad, Dawla was one of the aristocratic titles bestowed by the ruling Nizam upon Muslim court retainers, ranking above Khan, Khan Bahadur, Nawab (homonymous with a high Muslim ruler's title), Jang (in ascending order), but under Mulk, Umara and Jah. The equivalent for the court's Hindu retainers was Vant. The Qajar dynasty of Persia used titles with the suffix  as an honorific for members of the royal family. In early modern Egypt and the Beylik of Tunis,  ('Lord of the State') were used as honorifics for high-ranking ministers, while  ('Head of the State"' was the formal title of Abd el-Krim, the leader of the Rif Republic.

Examples of the honorific al-Dawla

 Adud al-Dawla
 Ala al-Dawla
 Amid al-Dawla
 Amin al-Dawla
 Asad al-Dawla
 Baha' al-Dawla
 Diya' al-Dawla
 Fakhr al-Dawla
 Husam al-Dawla
 Iftikhar al-Dawla
 Imad al-Dawla
 I'timad al-Dawla
 Izz al-Dawla
 Jalal al-Dawla
 Majd al-Dawla
 Mu'ayyad al-Dawla
 Mu'izz al-Dawla
 Mumahhid al-Dawla
 Murtada al-Dawla
 Musharrif al-Dawla
 Mushir al-Dawla
 Mu'tamid al-Dawla
 Nasir al-Dawla
 Qawam al-Dawla
 Rukn al-Dawla
 Sa'ad al-Dawla
 Sa'd al-Dawla
 Sa'id al-Dawla
 Sama' al-Dawla
 Samsam al-Dawla
 Sayf al-Dawla
 Shams al-Dawla
 Sharaf al-Dawla
 Shibl al-Dawla Nasr
 Siraj ud-Dawla
 Sultan al-Dawla
 Taj al-Dawla
 'Uddat al-Dawla
 Zahir al-Dawla

Notes

Sources
 
 
 

Islamic culture
Court titles
Dawla
Islamic honorifics